The Puerto Rico Department of Justice (PR DOJ) is the  Executive Department of the Commonwealth of Puerto Rico responsible for the enforcement of the  local law in the commonwealth and the administration of justice. The Department is equivalent to the State Bureau of Investigation in many states. The Department is headed by the Secretary of Justice of Puerto Rico and has been in existence in one form or another since Puerto Rico was a Spanish colony. The current agency was created by the Constitution of Puerto Rico in 1952.

The Department, headquartered in a multi-story building in the Miramar sector of San Juan, includes a structure of District Attorneys to handle criminal caseload, as well as specialized divisions to handle antitrust cases, general civil cases, public integrity (corruption) and federal litigation, among others.

Agencies

 Special Investigations Bureau

Secretary of Justice

The Department's head, the Attorney General, is appointed by the Governor of Puerto Rico, and serves at his pleasure, after receiving the consent of the Senate of Puerto Rico. Puerto Rico's Solicitor General, which handles appellate work, is also appointed by the governor and subject to the advice and consent of the Senate. Formers secretaries include:

See also 
Crime in Puerto Rico
Murder of Lorenzo González Cacho

References

External links
  
 NAAG & ASCLD Partner to Assist Puerto Rico Forensic Science Laboratory

Department of Justice of Puerto Rico
Executive departments of the government of Puerto Rico
Government agencies established in 1952
1952 establishments in Puerto Rico